Yorkshire Diamonds were an English women's Twenty20 cricket team based in Leeds, Yorkshire. They were formed in 2016 to compete in the inaugural season of the Women's Cricket Super League. They played their home matches at grounds across Yorkshire, including Headingley Cricket Ground and Clifton Park, York, and were partnered with Yorkshire County Cricket Club. They were coached by Danielle Hazell and captained by Lauren Winfield. In 2020, following reforms to the structure of women's domestic cricket, some elements of the Yorkshire Diamonds were retained for a new team, the Northern Diamonds.

History

2016-2019: Women's Cricket Super League

Yorkshire Diamonds were formed in 2016 to compete in the new Women's Cricket Super League, partnering with Yorkshire CCC. In their inaugural season, they finished 5th out of 6 in the group stage, winning just one game, against Lancashire Thunder. They fared similarly in 2017, again finishing 5th, with two victories.

In 2018, an expansion in the format, to 10 games per team, saw no change to Yorkshire Diamonds' fortunes, again finishing 5th in the table, with three wins. In their final season, 2019, the Diamonds won five games to achieve their highest ever finish, in 4th, and were the only team to beat eventual winners Western Storm.  Diamonds overseas player Jemimah Rodrigues was the second highest run-scorer in the tournament, with 401 runs, including 112* against Southern Vipers. This still meant they missed out on Finals Day, however, and the 2020 restructure of English domestic women's cricket meant that the Yorkshire Diamonds were disbanded, succeeded in spirit by the Northern Diamonds, who represent a larger area, but retain some of their players.

Home grounds

Players
Final squad, 2019 season.
 No. denotes the player's squad number, as worn on the back of their shirt.
  denotes players with international caps.

Overseas players
  Shabnim Ismail – South Africa (2016)
  Beth Mooney – Australia (2016, 2018)
  Alex Blackwell – Australia (2016)
   Chamari Atapattu – Sri Lanka (2017-2018)
  Sophie Devine – New Zealand (2017)
  Suné Luus – South Africa (2017)
  Delissa Kimmince – Australia (2018)
  Alyssa Healy – Australia (2019)
  Jemimah Rodrigues – India (2019)
  Leigh Kasperek – New Zealand (2019)

Seasons

Statistics

Overall Results

 Abandoned matches are counted as NR (no result)
 Win or loss by super over or boundary count are counted as tied.

Teamwise Result summary

Records
Highest team total: 185/6, v Southern Vipers on 25 August, 2019.
Lowest team total: 64, v Southern Vipers on 30 July, 2016.
Highest individual score: 112*, Jemimah Rodrigues v Southern Vipers on 25 August, 2019.
Best individual bowling analysis: 5/26, Katherine Brunt v Southern Vipers on 2 August, 2018.
Most runs: 627 in 28 matches, Lauren Winfield.
Most wickets: 29 wickets in 28 matches, Katie Levick.

References

Yorkshire Diamonds
Women's Cricket Super League teams
2016 establishments in England
 
Cricket in Yorkshire
Sport in Leeds
Cricket clubs established in 2016